Cevicos is a town and municipality in the Sánchez Ramírez province of the Dominican Republic. Municipal population, as of 2012, is of 12,589. Town's proper population is of 4,285.

Overview
The town is located in a green plateau between Cotuí and Sabana Grande de Boyá. It municipal district (or hamlet) is the village of La Cueva.

Cevicos produces fruits like mango, pineapple, sugar cane, passion fruit and many others.

Climate

References 

Populated places in Sánchez Ramírez Province
Municipalities of the Dominican Republic